is a 2,646m mountain on the border of Chino and Koumi of Nagano in Japan. This mountain is the highest mountains of Northern Yatsugatake Volcanic Group. Named for the mythical avian creatures of Japanese folklore, the Tengu.

Description
Mount Tengu is a stratovolcano. This mountain is a part of the Yatsugatake-Chūshin Kōgen Quasi-National Park. This mountain is on the list of the 200 famous mountains in Japan. This mountain has two major peaks, Mount Higashi Tengu, and Mount Nishi Tengu.

Access 
 Tatsunokan Bus Stop of Suwa Bus

Gallery

References
 Ministry of Environment of Japan
 Official Home Page of the Geographical Survey Institute in Japan
  ‘Yatsugatake, Tateshina, Utsukushigahara, Kirigamine 2008, Shobunsha
 

Tengu
Tengu
Stratovolcanoes of Japan
Pleistocene stratovolcanoes